

Half pipe

Moguls

Dual Moguls

Aerials

2007 Canada Winter Games